The Prémio Leya is a Portuguese literary award established in 2008 and awarded annually by the Portuguese book publishing company Leya to an unpublished Portuguese-language novel. The winner receives €100,000, making it one of the richest literary prizes in the world.

Winners
2008: Murilo Antônio de Carvalho (Brazil), for O Rastro do Jaguar.
2009: João Paulo Borges Coelho (Mozambique), for O Olho de Hertzog.
2010: not assigned
2011: João Ricardo Pedro (Portugal), with the book O teu rosto será o último.
2012: Nuno Camarneiro (Portugal), for Debaixo de algum céu. 
2013: Gabriela Ruivo Trindade, Uma Outra Voz. 
2014: Afonso Reis Cabral (Portugal), O Meu Irmão. 
2015: António Tavares (Portugal), O Coro dos Defuntos.
2016: not assigned
2017: João Pinto Coelho (Portugal), Os Loucos da Rua Mazur.
2018: Itamar Vieira Júnior (Brazil), Torto Arado.

References

Awards established in 2008
Portuguese literary awards
2008 establishments in Portugal
Portuguese-language literary awards